Luke Carroll is an Australian stage, television and film actor.

Education
Carroll attended Marcellin College Randwick and graduated in 1996.

Television and film
Carroll started out in guest roles in some Australian shows, including The Flying Doctors, Lift Off, The Man from Snowy River, Ocean Girl and Water Rats, but made a name for himself when he took the leading role in the film Australian Rules.

He then had regular roles in some Australian dramas, including The Alice (2005) and the mini-series RAN (2006). In 2007, he co-hosted (with Cathy Freeman) Going Bush, a travel show for SBS Television. Later that year he completed filming in The Tender Hook, and also filmed a seven-week stint in the soap opera, Home and Away.

In September 2009, he hosted The Deadlys for SBS. Also in 2009, he co-starred in the film, Stone Bros. and appeared in Subdivision. In 2010 he starred in Needle.

He appeared in an Australian Government advertisement about being "Climate Clever",
and has also been involved in the children's television show, Play School.

Stage
Carroll has made many appearances in theatre, from 2001 to the present time (2021).

In 2013 Carroll appeared on stage in a Yirra Yaakin/ Belvoir production of Bob Merritt's 1975 play about Aboriginal life on a mission, The Cake Man.

In 2018 and 2019 he toured with Nakkiah Lui's Black Is the New White.

Personal life
Carroll is a supporter of rugby league club the South Sydney Rabbitohs.

Awards and recognition
 2002: Nominated in Best Actor in a Supporting Role at AFI Awards for his role in Australian Rules
 2005: Nominated for Actor of the Year at The Deadlys for his role in The Alice
 2006: Nominated in Best Guest or Supporting Actor in Television Drama at AFI Awards for his role in RAN
2008: Recipient of the Bob Maza Fellowship, which recognises emerging acting talent and support professional development for Indigenous actors
 2009: Nominated for Actor of the Year at The Deadlys for his role in Stone Bros.

References

External links
 

Living people
1982 births
20th-century Australian male actors
21st-century Australian male actors
Wiradjuri people
Australian children's television presenters
Australian male film actors
Australian male child actors
Australian male soap opera actors
Indigenous Australian male actors
Male actors from Sydney